Nu couché (also known in English as Red Nude or Reclining Nude) is a 1917 oil on canvas painting by the Italian artist Amedeo Modigliani. It is one of his most widely reproduced and exhibited paintings.

2015 sale 
The painting realized $170,405,000 at a Christie's New York sale on 9 November 2015, a record for a Modigliani painting and placing it high among the most expensive paintings ever sold. The purchaser was the Chinese businessman Liu Yiqian. Liu is believed to have paid for the painting using his American Express card.

Painting 

The painting is one of a famous series of nudes that Modigliani painted in 1917 under the patronage of his Polish dealer Léopold Zborowski. It is believed to have been included in Modigliani's first and only art show in 1917, at the Galerie Berthe Weill, which was shut down by the police. Christie's lot notes for their November 2015 sale of the painting observed that this group of nudes by Modigliani served to reaffirm and reinvigorate the nude as a subject of modernist art.

Commentary 
 The Guardian art critic  Jonathan Jones notes that Modigliani continues the tradition of Titian's Venus of Urbino. That tradition of glorifying the human body infuses the sexuality of Modigliani's nude, reinvented a decade before by the paintings of Pablo Picasso and Henri Matisse. Jones remarks that Modigliani was a religious artist and his religion was desire.

Provenance 
Léopold Zborowski, Paris.
 Jonas Netter, Paris.
 Riccardo and Cesarina Gualino, Turin (acquired in Paris, 2 October 1928).
 Società Anonima Finanziaria, Zaccaria Pisa, Milan; collection sale, Galleria Pesaro, Milan, 5–8 February 1934, lot 185.
 Pietro Feroldi, Brescia (by 1935).
 Gianni Mattioli, Milan (acquired from the above, 1949)
 by descent to Laura Mattioli Rossi (1977)
 Liu Yiqian, Shanghai, 2015 (sold at Christie's, New York, 9 November 2015 for $170,405,000).

See also
Paintings by Amedeo Modigliani
List of most expensive paintings

References

External links 
 Christie's video
 Nu Couché by Modigliani | Check123- Video Encyclopedia
 The creation of the modern Olympia — from Courbet to Freud Christie's article on the three nudes, by Courbet, Modigliani and Freud respectively, offered at its November 2015 sale.

1917 paintings
Paintings by Amedeo Modigliani
Nude art